Pardshaw Young Friends' Centre was located within the historic Pardshaw Friends Meeting House complex, near Cockermouth in Cumbria, England. The centre provided basic accommodation and facilities for groups connected with the Religious Society of Friends and was primarily aimed at young adult Friends, known within Britain Yearly Meeting as Young Friends.

Young Friends began their association with the meeting house in the 1970s.  They contributed to the maintenance of the building in annual work camps, a tradition which was still extant as of 2018.  The large meeting room in the meeting house became a large very simple bunkhouse with cooking, sleeping and common room space; a shower and washing facilities were subsequently built by Young Friends in the adjacent stable block and a flush WC built at the end of the schoolroom block some time in the 1980s.

In around 2007-2008 Young Friends' General Meeting laid down the Young Friends. Pardshaw Centre as an active concern, and administration of the facility passed to a small group of Friends in the local meeting continuing to offer the same very basic facilities to a broadly similar target area of users.

In the fourth month of 2018 after a Threshing Meeting held at Pardshaw Meeting House, a small group, The Pardshaw Development Group was established to develop and carry forward a vision for the Pardshaw Meeting House.  In 2021 a Charitable Incorporated Orgaisation, "Pardshaw Quaker Centre", was established.

References

 Charlie Blackfield's Pardshaw page (somewhat out of date in places)
http://heritage.quaker.org.uk/files/Pardshaw%20LM.pdf
https://pardshawquakercentre.org.uk/

External links
Report in The Friend on future of Pardshaw Meeting House
Minutes of YFGM from the tenth month 2008 laying down Pardshaw as an active concern
https://register-of-charities.charitycommission.gov.uk/charity-search/-/charity-details/5171781/charity-overview

Quakerism in the United Kingdom
Quakerism in England